Patricia "Patty" Boydstun (-Hovdey) (born December 22, 1951) is a former World Cup alpine ski racer from the United States.

Born in Council, Idaho, she competed on the World Cup circuit in the early 1970s, and finished eighth in the slalom at the 1972 Winter Olympics. She had ten top ten finishes in World Cup slaloms; the first came at age 16 in April 1968 at Heavenly Valley, California.

In March 1970, Boydstun won the U.S. national title in slalom in Vermont at Glen Ellen, which was later annexed by adjacent Sugarbush.

Raised in McCall, Boydstun learned to ski and race at the Little Ski Hill and Brundage Mountain, where her father Johnny was its first employee and mountain manager for 

She married Dean Hovdey in the 1970s and they founded a sporting goods store in McCall in 1979 which they continue to own and operate.

World Cup results

Season standings

Points were only awarded for top ten finishes (see scoring system).

Race top tens

 10 top tens - (all in slalom)

Olympic results  

From 1948 through 1980, the Winter Olympics were also the World Championships for alpine skiing.

References

External links

Patty Boydstun World Cup standings at the International Ski Federation
 
 
 

1951 births
Living people
American female alpine skiers
Olympic alpine skiers of the United States
Alpine skiers at the 1972 Winter Olympics
21st-century American women